Alexander Garrievich Gordon (born February 20, 1964) is a Russian radio and television presenter, journalist, actor and director.  He has worked on "NTV" channel and "Channel One".  As of January 2023, Gordon is the host of  First Channel's Dok-Tok.

Personal life
Gordon is Russian Jewish descent. He is a son of the poet and artist from Odessa, Harry Gordon and Antonina Striga. He has been married five times and has four children.

Honors and awards
  
 2007 - TEFI for the "Talk Show" (program "Private screening").
 2008 - TEFI for the categories "Talk Show" and "talk-show" (the program "private screening").
 2010 - TEFI for the "Talk show host" (the program "Gordon Quixote").
 2011 - TEFI for the "Talk show host" (the program "private screening").

Filmography
Gordon has also been a film-maker, creating several full-length feature films. Two of his movies, The Shepherd of His Cows and Brothel Lights, were based on the works of his father.

Director
 2002 - "The Shepherd of His Cows" (based on the book by Harry Gordon)
 2009 - "Liberal Democratic Party. 20 years of face-to-Russia"
 2010 - "Blizzard"
 2011 - "Brothel Lights"

Trivia 
His last name is pronounced with stress on the last syllable, i.e. rhyming with "tone", unlike the regular pronunciation of "Gordon" rhyming with "done".

References

External links
 «Бесы» лезут в телевизор — обзор критической прессы о театральном спектакле А. Гордона «Одержимые». 
 Подопытные люди («Известия», 15 октября 2004) — о ток-шоу «Стресс». 
 ИСПЫТАНИЕ ГОРДОНОМ («Профиль», 20 октября 2008) — о ток-шоу «Гордон Кихот». 

Russian male actors
1964 births
Soviet male actors
Living people
Russian journalists
Russian television presenters
People from Obninsk
Russian male television actors
Russian film directors